Axcelis Technologies, Inc. is an American company engaging in the design, manufacture, and servicing of capital equipment for the semiconductor manufacturing industry worldwide. It produces ion implantation systems, including high and medium current implanters, and high energy implanters, and curing systems used in the fabrication of semiconductor chips. The company was incorporated in 1995 and is headquartered in Beverly, Massachusetts, United States.

In 2000, Eaton Corporation spun off its semiconductor manufacturing equipment business as Axcelis Technologies.

On December 4, 2012 Axcelis Technologies decided "...that it will exit the dry-strip business and divest its dry-strip intellectual property and technology, including the advanced non-oxidizing process technology of its Integra product line, to Lam Research,...Axcelis will continue to ship its 300 mm dry-strip products through August 2013..."

In 2015, Axcelis sold its headquarters in a leaseback agreement.

See also
 List of S&P 600 companies

References

External links

Companies listed on the Nasdaq
Equipment semiconductor companies
Companies based in Beverly, Massachusetts
Electronics companies of the United States